The 2000 NCAA Division I softball tournament was held 18 through May 29, 2000, as the final part of the 2000 NCAA Division I softball season. The tournament culminated with the 2000 Women's College World Series at USA Softball Hall of Fame Stadium in Oklahoma City.

Format
A total of 48 teams entered the tournament, with 32 of them receiving an automatic bid by either winning their conference's tournament or by finishing in first place in their conference. The remaining 32 bids were issued at-large, with selections extended by the NCAA Selection Committee.

Bids

Automatic

At-large

Regionals

Regional No. 1

Washington qualifies for WCWS.

Regional No. 2

Arizona qualifies for WCWS.

Regional No. 3

Oklahoma qualifies for WCWS.

Regional No. 4

UCLA qualifies for WCWS.

Regional No. 5

Alabama qualifies for WCWS.

Regional No. 6

California qualifies for WCWS.

Regional No. 7

Southern Miss qualifies for WCWS.

Regional No. 8

DePaul qualifies for WCWS.

Women's College World Series
The Women's College World Series was held 24 through May 28 in Oklahoma City.

Participants

Oklahoma

UCLA

Bracket

Game results

Championship game

All-tournament Team
The following players were members of the Women's College World Series All-Tournament Team.

References

2000 NCAA Division I softball season
NCAA Division I softball tournament